Louis Bergaud (born 30 November 1928 in Embrassac de Jabeyrac) was a French professional road bicycle racer.

Major results

1954
Tour de Corrèze
Tour de France:
7th place overall classification
1955
Felletin
Montluçon
Issoire
1956
Belvès
1957
Polymultipliée
Montélimar
1958
Bor-les-Orgues
Getxo
Polymultipliée
Tour de France:
9th place overall classification
Winner stage 13
1959
Circuit d'Auvergne
Pléaux
Saint-Flour
1961
Pléaux
Tour de France:
Winner stage 5

External links 

Official Tour de France results for Louis Bergaud

French male cyclists
1928 births
Living people
French Tour de France stage winners
Sportspeople from Cantal
Cyclists from Auvergne-Rhône-Alpes